St Clement's Church is a Grade II listed building on Hulton Street, Ordsall, Salford, Greater Manchester, England. It is an active Anglican parish church in the Anglican Diocese of Manchester.

History
The church was built between 1877 and 1878, and was designed by the Lancaster architects Paley and Austin at a cost of £9,000. The land for the church was given by Lord Egerton, who also paid for the church and its parsonage. The church closed in the 1980s, but re-opened around 2005.

The Anglican parish church is located on Groves Avenue, off Hulton Street, Ordsall, Salford, Greater Manchester. It can be seen from the Eccles line of the Manchester Metrolink. It is in the deanery of Salford, the archdeaconry of Salford and the diocese of Manchester. Its current minister is Rev. Sandra Kearney.

The church can be seen in the first set of closing titles of Coronation Street. Nearby St. Clement's Drive was built on the site of Archie Street, which was the model for Coronation Street itself.

Architecture
St Clement's is constructed in red brick and terracotta and has a tiled roof. It is designed in a 13th-century gothic style. Its plan consists of a seven-bay nave with a clerestory, a chancel and north and south aisles. Above the chancel is a flèche with cladding in Westmorland slate. The nave and chancel are divided by buttresses across the aisles. Along the aisles are seven three-light windows. The clerestory contains round windows. The east end contains a five-light window, above which is an arch and gable with three stepped blind lancets, as well as heavy angle buttresses. At the west end is an unusual gabled portal in moulded brick with a roundel in terracotta containing tracery.

Inside the church the arcades are carried on round sandstone piers. The chancel is floored with Doulton tiles, and on its walls are murals depicting religious scenes, also in Doulton tiles. It also contains a tripartite sedilia. The chancel is vaulted. Part of the nave has been partitioned to form a meeting room. The two-manual organ was built by Willis.

It was designated as a Grade II listed building on 18 January 1980.

It also has an associated community hall.

See also

Listed buildings in Salford, Greater Manchester
List of ecclesiastical works by Paley and Austin

References

Grade II listed churches in the City of Salford
Church of England church buildings in Greater Manchester
Anglican Diocese of Manchester
Churches completed in 1878
19th-century Church of England church buildings
Gothic Revival church buildings in England
Gothic Revival architecture in Greater Manchester
Paley and Austin buildings